The Silda camp attack occurred on 15 February 2010, when dozens of Naxalite Maoist insurgents ambushed Indian security forces in Silda (some 60 km from Midnapore) in West Bengal, India. The resulting death of 24 paramilitary personnel of the Eastern Frontier Rifles, and several believed to be abducted, made the attack a hard blow to the government's fight against the rebels.

Maoist gang leader Syam Saran Tudu was arrested in April 2013. He was facing murder and other charges, besides his role in the attack.

References 

21st-century mass murder in India
Communist Party of India (Maoist)
Naxalite–Maoist insurgency
2010 in India
Conflicts in 2010
2010s in West Bengal
Terrorist incidents in India in 2010